Seend Cleeve is a large hamlet or sub-village immediately west of Seend in Wiltshire, England.

A Primitive Methodist chapel with Sunday school was built in 1841 at Seend Cleeve. In 1849, the chapel was rebuilt in red brick with ashlar quoins. The chapel closed in 1979 and was converted into a private house in 2012.

Seend Cleeve Quarry was a source of brown haematite; since 1987 the quarry has been a Geological Site of Special Scientific Interest. There was an ironworks in the second half of the 19th century, and quarrying continued until 1946.

Seend Cleeve has two public houses: the Barge Inn on the Kennet and Avon Canal, and the Brewery Inn.

References

Further reading

External links
 Seend Parish Council
 Seend community website

Villages in Wiltshire